Mimudea ignitalis is a moth in the family Crambidae. It was described by George Hampson in 1913. It is found in the Nigeria.

References

Endemic fauna of Nigeria
Moths described in 1913
Spilomelinae